Josiah Crudup House is a historic home located near Kittrell, Vance County, North Carolina.  It was built between 1833 and 1837, purchased by Josiah Crudup around 1835, and was originally a version of the tripartite Federal style composition and consisted of a two-story, three bay, central section with one-story flanking wings.  It was later enlarged and modified to its present form as a two-story central portion, topped by a steep pediment, and flanking two-story sections each with rather steep hip roofs.

It was listed on the National Register of Historic Places in 1979.

References

Houses on the National Register of Historic Places in North Carolina
Federal architecture in North Carolina
Houses completed in 1837
Houses in Vance County, North Carolina
National Register of Historic Places in Vance County, North Carolina